German submarine U-821 was a short-lived Type VIIC U-boat of Nazi Germany's Kriegsmarine, built by Oderwerke in Stettin during World War II for service in the Battle of the Atlantic. She only participated in two brief combat patrols, one of which ended after four days when she was sunk by allied aircraft. U-821 was built in Stettin at a small shipyard, and thus took eighteen months to complete, being ready by October 1943. The boat was of the VIIC Type, which possessed long range cruising capabilities as well as five torpedo tubes.

Design
German Type VIIC submarines were preceded by the shorter Type VIIB submarines. U-821 had a displacement of  when at the surface and  while submerged. She had two shafts and two  propellers.

U-821 was fitted with five  torpedo tubes (four fitted at the bow and one at the stern), fourteen torpedoes, one  SK C/35 naval gun, (220 rounds), one  Flak M42 and two twin  C/30 anti-aircraft guns. The boat had a complement of between forty-four and sixty.

Service history

War patrols
Following her sea trials and warming-up period, U-821 departed Bergen, Norway on 19 March 1944 for her first war patrol, during which she spent 24 fruitless days in the North Atlantic before returning to Brest, France for resupply. Her second patrol was more eventful, as just four days out from Brest and not far from Ushant, Royal Air Force aircraft spotted and attacked the U-boat on the surface. Her captain made the decision to battle it out rather than dive, and engaged in a running firefight with three Mosquito aircraft of 248 Squadron and a large Consolidated Liberator bomber of 206 Squadron. One Mosquito was shot down in the clash, but rockets and depth charges took their toll on the submarine which soon sank, taking with her 50 sailors, in position . One survivor was pulled from the sea by small German naval units a few hours later.

The sinking was filmed by gun camera footage on board the attacking aircraft.

References

Bibliography

External links

World War II submarines of Germany
German Type VIIC submarines
World War II shipwrecks in the English Channel
U-boats sunk by British aircraft
U-boats commissioned in 1943
U-boats sunk in 1944
1943 ships
Shipwrecks in the Bay of Biscay
Ships built in Stettin
U-boats sunk by depth charges
Maritime incidents in June 1944